Yoon Ki-Sook is a former female table tennis player from South Korea. In 1967 she won two medals in single and team events in the Asian Table Tennis Championships.

See also
 List of table tennis players

References

South Korean female table tennis players
Year of birth missing (living people)
Living people
Asian Games medalists in table tennis
Place of birth missing (living people)
Table tennis players at the 1966 Asian Games
Asian Games silver medalists for South Korea
Asian Games bronze medalists for South Korea
Medalists at the 1966 Asian Games
20th-century South Korean women